Cangamba Airport  is an airport serving Cangamba in Moxico Province, Angola.

See also

 List of airports in Angola
 Transport in Angola

References

External links 
OpenStreetMap - Cangamba
OurAirports - Cangamba

Airports in Angola